Person of Interest is the first soundtrack of the American television series Person of Interest, composed by Ramin Djawadi, bringing together music used for the first season. Released in November 2012, the album includes twenty-one music composed specially for seasons 1 of Person of Interest.

The album contains only the creations of Ramin Djawadi, thus, all other music or songs used in the series are not present.

Track listing
All music by Ramin Djawadi, except where noted.

Credits and personnel
Personnel adapted from the album liner notes.

 J. J. Abrams – Additional Music, Soundtrack Executive Producer, Theme
 Tony Blondal – Orchestration
 Bryan Burk – Soundtrack Executive Producer
 Brandon Campbell – Arranger
 Stephen Coleman – Conductor, Orchestration
 Ramin Djawadi – Composer, Conductor, Musical Producer, Primary Artist
 Patricia Sullivan Fourstar – Mastering
 Milton Gutierrez – Assistant Engineer
 Jonah Holan – Liner Notes
 Hollywood Studio Symphony – Orchestra

 Steve Kaplan – Scoring Engineer
 Kathy Matthews – Coordination
 Jonathan Nolan – Soundtrack Executive Producer
 Greg Plageman – Liner Notes, Soundtrack Executive Producer
 Peter Rotter – Orchestra Contractor
 Bronwyn Savasta – Executive in Charge of Music
 Robert Townson – Executive Producer
 Tom Trafalski – Music Editor
 Booker White 	– Music Preparation
 Parsa Vandy – Soundtrack Preparation
 Catherine Wilson – Technical Score Advisor

References 

Album
2012 soundtrack albums
Ramin Djawadi soundtracks
Television soundtracks
Varèse Sarabande soundtracks